Giorgi Anchabadze (born 4 January 1973) is a Georgian former footballer.

References

External links

Soviet footballers
Footballers from Georgia (country)
Association football midfielders
FC Dinamo Tbilisi players
Expatriate footballers from Georgia (country)
Expatriate footballers in Cyprus
Cypriot First Division players
Expatriate sportspeople from Georgia (country) in Cyprus
Living people
1973 births